Southwaite is a small village in the parish of Hesket, in the Eden District, in the English county of Cumbria.

Location
It has the west coast main line going through the middle of it and the River Petteril nearby. It once had a railway station called Southwaite railway station but it was closed in 1952. Historically it was within Inglewood Forest.

Nearby settlements
Nearby settlements include the villages of Ivegill, Low Hesket, High Hesket and the hamlet of Mellguards.

See also

Listed buildings in Hesket, Cumbria

References

External links
 Cumbria County History Trust: Hesket in the Forest (nb: provisional research only – see Talk page)

Villages in Cumbria
Eden District
Inglewood Forest